Law enforcement in Denmark is handled by a number of organisations, under the resort of various ministries:

 Ministry of Justice:
 Police of Denmark, common law enforcement
 Rigspolitiet, specialised police enforcement
 Politiets Aktionsstyrke, police special response unit
 Politiets Efterretningstjeneste, national security and intelligence service
 Tax Ministry:
 SKAT, tax, customs and border authority
 Ministry of Defence:
 Forsvarets Efterretningstjeneste, military intelligence and foreign intelligence service
 Danish Military Police, police enforcement within Danish military
 Danish Home Guard Police Branch, simple enforcement on behalf of either the Police of Denmark or Danish Military Police
 Ministry of Food, Agriculture and Fisheries:
 The , inspection of food handling companies
 The , inspection of fishing vessels in Danish waters

See also 
 Crime in Denmark

References